General Burger may refer to:

Joseph C. Burger (1902–1982), U.S. Marine Corps lieutenant general
Matthew J. Burger (fl. 1990s–2020s), U.S. Air Force major general
Schalk Willem Burger (1852–1918), South African Republic general

See also
General Berger (disambiguation)